Duthro Sharif  (Sindhi:ڊٺڙو شريف) is a village located in Talkua Tando Adam, District Sanghar in Sindh province, Pakistan. The Shrine of Pir Hadi Hassan Bux Shah Jilani is also located in the south east of Duthro Sharif.

References

Villages in Sindh
Villages in Pakistan